Stephanie Land (born September 1978) is an American author and public speaker. She is best known for writing Maid: Hard Work, Low Pay and a Mother's Will to Survive (2019), which was adapted to television miniseries Maid (2021) for Netflix. Land has also written several articles about maid service work, abuse and poverty in the United States.

Early life and education
Land grew up between Washington and Anchorage, Alaska, in a middle class household. A car accident at age 16 led to her being diagnosed with post-traumatic stress disorder, a condition which was later exacerbated by her financial struggles.

In her late twenties, she lived in Port Townsend, Washington, where she had her first child and became a single mother who worked maid service jobs to support her family. Although she did not grow up in poverty, she spent the next several years living below the poverty line and relied on several welfare programs to cover necessary expenses; this later inspired her writing on issues of poverty and public policy. In January 2008, Land broke up with her boyfriend and moved to a homeless shelter with her then nine-month-old daughter. Land and her eldest daughter occasionally lived in homeless shelters, transitional housing and a camper in a driveway, before securing an apartment in low-income housing. The first line of her debut book reads: "My daughter learned to walk in a homeless shelter."

After six years of cleaning in Washington and Montana, she was eventually able to use student loans and Pell grants to move to earn a Bachelor of Arts in English and creative writing from the University of Montana in May 2014. During her studies, she published her first public writing in the form of blog posts and local publications followed by Internet-based publications such as HuffPost and Vox. Upon graduating from the University of Montana, Land ended her dependence on food stamps, started working as a freelance writer, and became a writing fellow with the Center for Community Change.

Career

Land's first book Maid: Hard Work, Low Pay and a Mother's Will to Survive was published by Hachette Books on January 22, 2019. The book—an elaboration of an article Land wrote for Vox in 2015—debuted at number three on The New York Times Best Seller list. Barack Obama placed the book on his "Summer Reading List" of 2019 and actress Reese Witherspoon said she "loved this story about one woman surviving impossible circumstances."

The book has received critical acclaim. In USA Today, Sharon Peters praised the book's honesty, writing that it fills the "with much candid detail about the frustrations with the limitations of programs she relied on. It is a picture of the soul-robbing grind through poverty that millions live with every day." Emily Cooke of The New York Times summed up her review by focusing on the clarity of Land's suffering in the work: "Land survived the hardship of her years as a maid, her body exhausted and her brain filled with bleak arithmetic, to offer her testimony. It’s worth listening to." Katy Read of The Star Tribune suggests, "The next time you hear someone say they think poor people are lazy, hand them a copy of Maid. Stephanie Land can tell them otherwise and, unlike most authors who write about poverty, speaks from personal—and recent—experience." In The Washington Post, Jenner Rogers writes, "Maid isn’t about how hard work can save you but about how false that idea is. It’s one woman’s story of inching out of the dirt and how the middle class turns a blind eye to the poverty lurking just a few rungs below—and it’s one worth reading." Kirkus Reviews concludes that Maid is "[a]n important memoir that should be required reading for anyone who has never struggled with poverty."

Maid: Hard Work, Low Pay and a Mother's Will to Survive was adapted to a 10-episode limited series Maid (2021) for the streaming service Netflix and released on October 1, 2021. The series starred Margaret Qualley, Andie MacDowell and Nick Robinson. On October 24, 2021, Forbes reported that Maid has remained in the most viewed "Top 5 Shows" since its release in numerous countries. According to Netflix, the show will likely reach 67 million households in its first four weeks, surpassing the record set by The Queen’s Gambit, which was watched by 62 million subscribers. National Domestic Violence Hotline and other resources were mentioned after each episode of Maid. National Domestic Violence Hotline received more calls in the month after Maid premiere than any other month in its entire 25-year history.

Her second book was announced in 2020 for release by One Signal Publishers, an imprint of Simon & Schuster. The book will combine Land's personal experiences with investigative reporting about higher education and the cost of it in the United States. 

Class: A Memoir of Motherhood, Hunger, and Higher Education is set to be published on October 3, 2023.

Personal life 
Stephanie Land is married to Tim Faust and they live as a blended family with four children. They both have two children from previous relationships. She owns a home in Montana and has three dogs.

Land has spoken openly about the stigma of receiving government assistance and the assumptions people had of her, when she was relying on food stamps. In a 2021 interview with The Washington Post, Land said:

Filmography

Bibliography

Books
Land, Stephanie. Maid: Hard Work, Low Pay and a Mother's Will to Survive (2019). Hachette Books. 
Land, Stephanie. Class: A Memoir of Motherhood, Hunger, and Higher Education (October 3, 2023). Atria/One Signal Publishers.

Authored articles
 Land, Stephanie (September 25, 2015). "The Three Car Crashes That Changed My Life" Narratively.
Land, Stephanie (October 1, 2015). "I lived on $6 a day with a 6-year-old and a baby on the way. It was extreme poverty." The Guardian.
Land, Stephanie (November 12, 2015). "I Spent 2 Years Cleaning Houses. What I Saw Makes Me Never Want to Be Rich". Vox.
Land, Stephanie (January 6, 2016). "What do you do when you can’t afford childcare? You get creative.". The Washington Post.
Land, Stephanie (December 5, 2016). "Trump’s Election Stole My Desire to Look for a Partner". The Washington Post.
Land, Stephanie (November 15, 2018). "The Day My Husband Strangled Me,". The Guardian.
Land, Stephanie (September 24, 2019). "I Used to Clean Houses. Then I Hired a Maid." The Atlantic.
Land, Stephanie (January 21, 2020). "My greatest honor: I wrote a book that touched people living in poverty". The Guardian.
Land, Stephanie (November 7, 2020). "Joe Biden, Kamala Harris and the Return of Empathy When America Needs It Most". Time.
Land, Stephanie (September 30, 2021). "I Left Poverty After Writing 'Maid.' But Poverty Never Left Me". Time.

See also
Nickel and Dimed: On (Not) Getting By in America (2000), an investigative piece on poverty and minimum wage work by Barbara Ehrenreich, also of the Economic Hardship Program and who wrote the introduction to Maid
Hand to Mouth: Living in Bootstrap America (2014), the debut book by Linda Tirado, also a memoir about poverty in the United States with an introduction written by Barbara Ehrenreich

References

External links

Profile and writings from the Center for Community Change
Maid excerpt from The New York Times

Living people
21st-century American memoirists
Writers from Washington (state)
21st-century American women writers
People from Port Townsend, Washington
University of Montana alumni
American bloggers
1978 births
American women memoirists
American women bloggers